Ptinus latro, the brown spider beetle, is a species of spider beetle in the family Ptinidae. It is found in Africa, Europe and Northern Asia (excluding China), North America, and Southern Asia.

References

Further reading

 
 

Ptinus
Articles created by Qbugbot
Beetles described in 1775
Taxa named by Johan Christian Fabricius